The British Academy Television Craft Award for Best Original Music is one of the categories presented by the British Academy of Film and Television Arts (BAFTA) within the British Academy Television Craft Awards, the craft awards were established in 2000 with their own, separate ceremony as a way to spotlight technical achievements, without being overshadowed by the main production categories. It was first awarded in 1981, according to the BAFTA website, a programme will be eligible to this category if "more than 50% of its music is original composition created specifically for it."

Winners and nominees

1980s

1990s

2000s

2010s

2020s

See also
 Primetime Emmy Award for Outstanding Music Composition for a Documentary Series or Special
 Primetime Emmy Award for Outstanding Music Composition for a Limited Series, Movie, or Special
 Primetime Emmy Award for Outstanding Music Composition for a Series

References

External links
 

Original Music